Desert West Lake is located in Desert West Park in Phoenix, Arizona, United States, east of 67th Avenue and south of Thomas Road.

Fish species
Rainbow Trout
Largemouth Bass
Sunfish
Catfish (Channel)
Carp

References

External links
Desert West Lake

Geography of Phoenix, Arizona
Reservoirs in Arizona
Reservoirs in Maricopa County, Arizona